The Volvo B5LH (initially known as the Volvo B5L Hybrid, also known as the Volvo BRLH) is a low-floor hybrid electric bus chassis for both single-decker buses and double-decker buses manufactured by Volvo since 2008. It is the basis for Volvo's integral 7700 Hybrid full low floor city bus and its successor, the 7900 Hybrid from 2011. In 2008, pre-production batches of both types of chassis were manufactured. Serial production started in June 2010. From 2013 it is also available as an articulated bus chassis. First entering service in London, the B5LH is the only current double decker type in service in the United Kingdom that uses a parallel hybrid drive system.

An updated version, the Volvo B5LHC, was launched in 2016, designed for high-capacity inner-city work. The chassis is available with Wright SRM bodywork, which in terms of front end styling is identical in appearance to London's New Routemaster buses.

On 14 April 2020, Volvo announced the S-Charge self-charging hybrid version of B5L chassis, which replaced original hybrid model. It is known as Volvo B5L S-Charge and can run in electric mode at the speeds up to 50 km/h, up from 20 km/h in previous model. Previous model continues to be available in certain markets, such as the UK.

Design and Performance

The B5LH is powered by Volvo's in-house parallel hybrid drive train that couple its I-SAM motor to a 5-litre D5-series diesel engine. The drive train is connected to the Volvo I-Shift automatic transmission that drives the rear axle. The whole drive train is mounted in-line at the left rear of the chassis, similar to the B7L. A lithium battery pack is mounted just behind the front left wheel, powering the I-SAM motor system.

The B5LH features stop-start system that allows its engine to cut off when the bus is stationary and the battery is sufficiently charged. It is also capable to drive at full-electric mode from standstill to up to  In service, Volvo claims that the B5LH achieves 35% improvement on fuel consumption and reduces the emission of greenhouse gases, including carbon dioxide by an equivalent amount. In-service data in London shows that the B5LH is demonstrating between 25 and 40% of fuel consumption improvement.

Initially, Wrightbus has been the solitary double-decker body supplier of the chassis. The pre-production batch was fitted with Eclipse Gemini bodywork, and production chassis to date received Eclipse Gemini 2 body. Currently, a lighter Eclipse Gemini 3 & Gemini 3 bodywork are offered to the Euro VI version of the chassis. Alexander Dennis is also offering its Enviro 400 bodywork to the chassis, following an order from Stagecoach in early 2014.

History
At least four Volvo 7700 Hybrid prototypes were built in late 2008 for initial testing before some of them from 2009 toured many countries as demonstrators, only having short periods of proper duty at various places. In early 2012 two of them ended up in the rather small city of Alta in Finnmark, Norway for year-long testing in the arctic climate with local operator Boreal Transport.

The first batch of six pre-production B5LH double-deckers entered service with Arriva London in 2009. Following successful trial, Arriva has followed up with further orders for its operations in London, Kent, Manchester, Merseyside, Northumbria and Yorkshire. With 259 examples, it is currently the largest operator of the type.

The B5LH has gained increasing popularity with other operators in the UK, with Go-Ahead London, London Sovereign, Metroline and Stagecoach London operating the type in London. Outside the capital, the B5LH has been purchased by BakerBus, Brighton & Hove, Bullocks Coaches, Ensignbus, First Essex, First Greater Manchester, First Leeds, Go North East, National Express West Midlands, Oxford Bus Company, Preston Bus. In many cases, a number of operators are operating the B5LHs alongside its main rival, the serial hybrid drive Alexander Dennis Enviro 400H.

In March 2014, Volvo also secured a landmark order of the type with Stagecoach for use on its Tayside operations. This batch of 18 buses will be, for the first time, bodied by Alexander Dennis.

As of April 2014, 434 B5LHs were in service in the UK (1 example has been destroyed by fire in 2013 before delivery), with a further 73 on order.

As of August 2021, 43 B5LHs are in service with Lothian Buses and its subsidiaries. 

Outside the UK, a Euro VI B5LH demonstrator was delivered to Dublin Bus in early 2014 for evaluation; Dublin planned to lease 3 of the vehicles, but were unable to fund the lease.
In 2017, Latrobe Valley Bus Lines, Australia, purchased 8, bodied with local Volgren bodywork.

In Singapore, the Land Transport Authority purchased fifty B5LH buses for S$30 million. These buses received MCV Evora bodywork. They entered service from December 2018 and the bus operators are SMRT Buses, SBS Transit and Tower Transit Singapore.

Engines

D5E, 4764 cc, in-line 4 cyl. turbodiesel (2008—2009)
 D5E215 - 158 kW (215 bhp), 800 Nm, Euro V

D5F, 4764 cc, in-line 4 cyl. turbodiesel (2009—2013)
 D5F215 - 161 kW (219 bhp), 800 Nm, Euro V/EEV

D5K, 5132 cc, in-line 4 cyl. turbodiesel (2013—present)
 D5K240 - 177 kW (240 bhp), 918 Nm, Euro VI

References

External links

Double-decker buses
Hybrid electric buses
Articulated buses
Vehicles introduced in 2008
B05LH
Low-floor buses
Bus chassis